Stasys Petronaitis (August 8, 1932 – May 2, 2016) was a Soviet and Lithuanian actor of theater and cinema. Honored Artist of the Lithuanian SSR (1982).

In 1950-1951 he studied in the studio under the direction of Juozas Miltinis. He worked as an actor drama theater in the city of Panevezys (in 1951–1973 years).

Many appeared in films,   making his debut in 1953 in the movie  directed by Aleksandr Faintsimmer.

Wife —  Regina Zdanavičiūtė (1925-2015), also an actress of theater and cinema; Honored Artist of the Lithuanian SSR (1974), People's Artist of the Lithuanian SSR (1985).

References

External links

 Стасис Пятронайтис краткая биография и фильмография

1932 births
2016 deaths
20th-century Lithuanian male actors
Soviet male film actors
Soviet male stage actors
Lithuanian male film actors
Lithuanian male television actors